Mark Harris (born April 24, 1966) is an American pastor and politician from North Carolina. He ran as a Republican to represent  in the United States House of Representatives in the 2016 and 2018 elections. In 2016, he was defeated in a Republican primary by incumbent Robert Pittenger. Harris ran for Congress again in 2018, and this time he defeated Pittenger in the Republican primary.

In the general election against Democratic opponent Dan McCready, initial tallies showed Harris winning the election; however, an election panel refused to certify these results after investigating reports of ballot fraud involving McCrae Dowless, a Republican political operative employed by the Harris campaign. Dowless was later criminally charged in connection with the alleged fraud, but Harris was not. In February 2019, the bipartisan North Carolina Board of Elections dismissed the results of the election and called for a new election to be held. Harris was not a candidate in the new election.

Early life 
Harris was born in Winston-Salem, North Carolina, on April 24, 1966. He attended local schools there before earning his bachelor's degree in political science from Appalachian State University. He earned both a Master of Divinity (M.Div.) and Doctor of Ministry (D.Min.) from Southeastern Baptist Theological Seminary.

Ministry career
Harris is the lead pastor at Trinity Baptist Church in Mooresville, North Carolina. He has served as the senior pastor of the First Baptist Church in Charlotte, North Carolina, and as president of the Baptist State Convention of North Carolina. He served as senior of Augusta, Georgia's Curtis Baptist Church from January 1, 2000 to July 2005.

Political career
Harris ran for the United States Senate in the 2014 election, finishing in third place in the Republican primary behind Thom Tillis and Greg Brannon. He later ran against incumbent congressman Robert Pittenger for the U.S. House in 2016. The election was close; after a recount, Pittenger was certified the winner by 134 votes.

2018 congressional campaign
Harris resigned from the First Baptist Church in 2017 and ran again for the U.S. House in 2018. This time, Harris defeated Pittenger in the Republican primary (which featured a higher turnout than the 2016 primary).  

After the November 6, 2018 general election, Harris was 905 votes ahead of his Democratic competitor, Dan McCready, after county election boards certified the election; however, the North Carolina Board of Elections voted 9-0 on November 27 to delay the election to investigate fraud allegations. Following an investigation, the Board ordered that a new election be held. Harris was not a candidate in the new election.

Election fraud allegations

Following the November 6, 2018, midterm elections in North Carolina's 9th congressional district, initial tallies put Harris 905 votes ahead of his Democratic competitor, Dan McCready. McCready conceded on the day after the election, but the state Democratic Party filed affidavits with the state's board of voters claiming that Harris had used independent contractors to collect unsealed absentee ballots from voters and alter them before submitting them to the post office. The North Carolina Board of Elections voted 9-0 on November 27 not to certify the election. 

The Board of Elections subsequently opened an investigation which centered around the activities of Leslie McCrae Dowless, who had felony convictions for perjury and fraud. Dowless had been employed by numerous campaigns of Republican candidates to orchestrate "get out the vote" efforts. The accusation is that Dowless, who was hired by the Harris campaign, paid workers to illegally collect absentee ballots from voters. According to The Washington Post, Harris directed the hiring of Dowless for his campaign even though Harris received personal warnings in 2016 that Dowless had almost certainly used questionable tactics to deliver absentee votes in rural Bladen county for Todd Johnson, another losing candidate in the  District's Republican congressional 2016 primary.

While the allegations of irregularities were being investigated, Harris sought to have himself certified as the winner of the election. In January 2019, Harris filed a petition to have a court certify him as the winner of the election; Harris's petition was rejected that same month. That same month, Harris said "no evidence has been supplied that suggests the outcome of the race is in question"; The News & Observer disputed Harris's assertion, stating that it was "extremely unlikely" that Harris knew "the extent of evidence that has been submitted to the NC elections board". On February 9, 2019, Harris said that "Democrats and liberal media have spared no expense disparaging" his good name and blamed "a liberal activist" on the Board of Elections for controversy surrounding the election. He described the alleged ballot-harvesting scheme as "unsubstantiated slandering". During the investigation, the North Carolina Republican Party declared, "Mark Harris won the election", calling on the state elections board to certify Harris as the winner. The party also defended Harris, describing him as an "innocent victim".

The outcome of the election remained uncertified while state election officials investigated the alleged fraud. In early January, Republican party officials refused to send Democratic Governor Roy Cooper the names of their party's candidates to fill vacancies on the board. Responding to their actions, Cooper said, "If politicians and the people they hire are manipulating the system to steal elections, all of us should pull together to get to the bottom of it and stop it — regardless of whether the candidate who finished ahead in a tainted election is a Republican or a Democrat". 

The North Carolina State Board of Elections held hearings from February 18 to February 21, 2019 in an effort to resolve the disputed election results. During those hearings, election officials complained that the Harris campaign had withheld incriminating documents. Lisa Britt, the daughter of Dowless's ex-wife, testified that under Dowless's direction, absentee ballots had been unlawfully collected from voters. Britt added that in some cases, Dowless's associates had filled in blank ballot votes to favor Republican candidates and had falsified witness signatures. Bladen County, where Dowless had operated, was the only county in which Harris had prevailed over McCready in the absentee ballot results. Harris's son, who is a federal prosecutor, told the board that he had repeatedly warned his father about Dowless and that Dowless might be involved in illegal activities. Harris told the board that Dowless had assured him that his operation was legal.

The New York Times wrote that Harris "appeared to mislead" the board with some of his testimony. Harris later acknowledged that some of his testimony had been inaccurate, blaming his health problems as an explanation for his erroneous testimony. He then said that "It's become clear to me the public's confidence in the 9th District seat general election has been undermined to an extent that a new election is warranted." Harris's attorney David Freedman also said "we agree that the actions that occurred in Bladen County likely affected the election."

On February 21, the Board of Elections unanimously voted to order a new election in the congressional race. The Board also ordered new elections in two other contests for local offices. The North Carolina Republican Party, which up until that point had been supporting Harris's prior demand to be certified as the winner of the election, also endorsed the call for the new election. On February 26, 2019, citing ill health, Harris declared that he would not compete in the new election.

Resolution
On February 27, 2019, Dowless was arrested after being indicted by a Wake County grand jury. He was charged with multiple counts related to illegal ballot handling and obstructing justice in the 2016 and 2018 elections. An additional four people who worked for him were also charged. In July, additional charges of perjury and solicitation to commit perjury were added in a superseding indictment.

On April 7, 2020, Dowless was indicted on federal charges of Social Security fraud. In the indictment, unsealed on April 21, prosecutors alleged that Dowless claimed disability and retirement benefits in 2017 and 2018, but failed to tell the Social Security Administration about over $132,000 in payments he received for working on the Harris campaign and one other campaign in the 2018 cycle. 

On July 15, 2020, Wake County District Attorney Lorrin Freeman announced she was closing her office's investigation into Harris and Dowless after her office and multiple state and federal agencies found insufficient evidence to prosecute him.  Dowless however, was found to have committed unrelated government fraud and sentenced to six months in prison and fined.

Political positions

Education
In 2014, Harris called for abolishing the U.S. Department of Education.

Federal budget
Harris has stated that he would support a Balanced Budget Amendment and cited concern over what was at the time $19 trillion in debt and $120 trillion in unfunded liabilities.

In 2014, Harris supported reforming Social Security, including reducing the future Social Security payments for those who were currently less than 50 years old.

Religion 
Harris has described Islam as "dangerous" and the work of Satan. In 2014, he claimed that Islam was taking over the world, including the United States.

In 2011, Harris said in a sermon at First Baptist Charlotte that there would never be peace between Jews and Muslims unless they convert to Christianity.

During the 2018 campaign, American Bridge 21st Century, a Democratic super PAC that conducts opposition research, brought attention to a 2013 sermon that Harris had given where he questioned whether it was the "healthiest pursuit" for women to prioritize their careers and independence over their biblical "core calling".

Social issues 
Harris opposed the Supreme Court's ruling in Roe v. Wade which prohibited bans on abortion. He has stated that the Affordable Care Act has made healthcare more costly for businesses.

Harris led supporters of North Carolina Amendment 1, which banned same-sex marriage in North Carolina in 2012. The amendment was found to be unconstitutional by a federal court in 2014, and prohibitions on same-sex marriage were found to be unconstitutional by the Supreme Court's Obergefell v. Hodges decision in 2015. After the Supreme Court ruling, Harris said, "one of the most devastating blows to the American way of life has been the breakdown of the family unit. A marriage consists of one man and one woman. The Supreme Court, in a 5–4 decision, decided otherwise."

Harris campaigned for the Public Facilities Privacy & Security Act (commonly known as the "bathroom bill") in North Carolina in 2016, which stated that in government buildings, individuals (such as students at state-operated schools) may only use restrooms and changing facilities that correspond to the sex identified on their birth certificate. The bill sparked a widespread backlash and boycott, including by major U.S. firms. Amid the backlash, Harris adamantly argued against repealing the bill. The bill was eventually repealed and replaced with House Bill 142 on March 30, 2017.

Personal life
Harris and his wife Beth have three children and six grandchildren.

In January 2019, Harris was reported to have falsely set off a fire alarm, allegedly to avoid news media. Harris explained his actions by stating that he was rushing to catch a sports game.

References

External links
 Mark Harris for Congress
 

1966 births
American anti-same-sex-marriage activists
Appalachian State University alumni
Baptist ministers from the United States
Baptists from North Carolina
Living people
North Carolina Republicans
Politicians from Charlotte, North Carolina
Candidates in the 2018 United States elections